This is a list of colonial and pre-Federal U.S. historical population, as estimated by the U.S. Census Bureau based upon historical records and scholarship. The counts are for total population, including persons who were enslaved, but generally excluding Native Americans. According to the Census Bureau, these figures likely undercount enslaved people. Shaded blocks indicate periods before the colony was established or chartered, as well as times when it was part of another colony.

1610–1690

1700–1780

See also
 Thirteen Colonies
 List of U.S. states and territories by historical population

Notes

References

United States States By Historical Population
Colonial Population, Historical
United States demography-related lists